The canton of Bléré is an administrative division of the Indre-et-Loire department, central France. Its borders were modified at the French canton reorganisation which came into effect in March 2015. Its seat is in Bléré.

It consists of the following communes:
 
Athée-sur-Cher
Azay-sur-Cher
Bléré
Céré-la-Ronde
Chenonceaux
Chisseaux
Cigogné
Civray-de-Touraine
Cormery
Courçay
La Croix-en-Touraine
Dierre
Épeigné-les-Bois
Francueil
Luzillé
Saint-Martin-le-Beau
Sublaines

References

Cantons of Indre-et-Loire